Dutch dialects are primarily the dialects that are both cognate with the Dutch language and are spoken in the same language area as the Dutch standard language. Dutch dialects are remarkably diverse and are found in the Netherlands and northern Belgium.

The province of Friesland is bilingual. The West Frisian language, distinct from Dutch, is spoken here along with standard Dutch and the Stadsfries dialect. A West Frisian standard language has also been developed.

First dichotomy
In the east, there is the Dutch Low Saxon language area: in Groningen, Drenthe, Overijssel, major parts of Gelderland, and parts of Flevoland, Friesland and Utrecht. The group is not Low Franconian and forms together with the Low Saxon variants in Germany the Low Saxon language.

Extension across the borders
 Gronings, spoken in Groningen (Netherlands), as well as the closely related varieties in adjacent East Frisia (Germany), has been influenced by the West Frisian language and takes a special position within the Low Saxon Language.
 South Guelderish (Zuid-Gelders) is a dialect spoken in Gelderland (Netherlands) and in adjacent parts of North Rhine-Westphalia (Germany).
 Brabantian (Brabants) is a dialect spoken in Antwerp, Flemish Brabant (Belgium) and North Brabant (Netherlands).
 West Flemish (Westvlaams) is spoken in West Flanders (Belgium), the western part of Zeelandic Flanders (Netherlands) and historically also in French Flanders (France).
 East Flemish (Oostvlaams) is spoken in East Flanders (Belgium) and the eastern part of Zeelandic Flanders (Netherlands).

Limburgish (Limburgish: Limburgs or Lèmburgs; Dutch: Limburgs) is spoken in Limburg (Belgium) as well as in Limburg (Netherlands) and extends across the German border. It is however not a Dutch dialect but a separate related language. The mixed dialect of Dutch-Limburgish unlike Limburgish proper does not typically extend into Germany beyond Selfkant.

Holland and the Randstad
In Holland, Hollandic is spoken, though the original forms of this dialect (which were heavily influenced by a West Frisian substratum and, from the 16th century on, by Brabantian dialects) are now relatively rare. The urban dialects of the Randstad, which are Hollandic dialects, do not diverge from standard Dutch very much, but there is a clear difference between the city dialects of Rotterdam, The Hague, Amsterdam or Utrecht. 

In some rural Hollandic areas, more authentic Hollandic dialects are still being used, especially north of Amsterdam.
Another group of dialects based on Hollandic is that spoken in the cities and larger towns of Friesland, where it partially displaced West Frisian in the 16th century and is known as Stadsfries ("Urban Frisian").

Minority languages
Germanic languages which have the status of official regional or minority language and are protected by the European Charter for Regional or Minority Languages in the Netherlands are Limburgish, Dutch Low Saxon and West Frisian.

Limburgish receives protection by chapter 2 of the charter. In Belgium, where Limburgish is spoken as well, it does not receive such recognition or protection, because Belgium did not sign the charter. Limburgish has been influenced by the Ripuarian dialects like the Cologne dialect Kölsch, and has had a somewhat different development since the late Middle Ages.

Dutch Low Saxon also receives protection by chapter 2 of the charter. In some states of Germany, depending on the state, Low German receives protection by chapter 2 or 3.

West Frisian receives protection by chapter 3 of the charter. (West) Frisian evolved from the same West Germanic branch as Anglo-Saxon and Old Saxon and is less akin to Dutch.

Recent use
Dutch dialects and regional languages are not spoken as often as they used to be. Recent research by Geert Driessen shows that the use of dialects and regional languages among both Dutch adults and youth is in heavy decline. In 1995, 27 percent of the Dutch adult population spoke a dialect or regional language on a regular basis, while in 2011 this was no more than 11 percent. In 1995, 12 percent of the primary school aged children spoke a dialect or regional language, while in 2011 this had declined to 4 percent. Of the three officially recognized regional languages Limburgish is spoken most (in 2011 among adults 54%, among children 31%) and Dutch Low Saxon least (adults 15%, children 1%); West Frisian occupies a middle position (adults 44%, children 22%). In Belgium, however, dialects are very much alive; many senior citizens there are unable to speak standard Dutch.

Flanders
In Flanders, there are four main dialect groups: 
 West Flemish (West-Vlaams) including French Flemish in the far North of France, 
 East Flemish (Oost-Vlaams), 
 Brabantian (Brabants), which includes several main dialect branches, including Antwerpian, and 
 Limburgish (Limburgs). 
Some of these dialects, especially West and East Flemish, have incorporated some French loanwords in everyday language. An example is fourchette in various forms (originally a French word meaning fork), instead of vork. Brussels is especially heavily influenced by French because roughly 85% of the inhabitants of Brussels speak French. 
The Limburgish in Belgium is closely related to Dutch Limburgish. An oddity of West Flemings (and to a lesser extent, East Flemings) is that, when they speak AN, their pronunciation of the "soft g" sound (the voiced velar fricative) is almost identical to that of the "h" sound (the voiced glottal fricative), thus, the words held (hero) and geld (money) sound nearly the same, except that the latter word has a 'y' /j/ sound embedded into the "soft g". When they speak their local dialect, however,  their "g" is almost the "h" of the Algemeen Nederlands, and they do not pronounce the "h".  Some Flemish dialects are so distinct that they might be considered as separate language variants, although the strong significance of language in Belgian politics would prevent the government from classifying them as such. West Flemish in particular has sometimes been considered a distinct variety. Dialect borders of these dialects do not correspond to present political boundaries, but reflect older, medieval divisions.

The Brabantian dialect group, for instance, also extends to much of the south of the Netherlands, and so does Limburgish. West Flemish is also spoken in Zeelandic Flanders (part of the Dutch province of Zeeland), and by older people in French Flanders (a small area that borders Belgium).

Non-European dialects, and daughter languages
 Until the early 20th century, variants of Dutch were still spoken by some descendants of Dutch colonies in the United States. New Jersey, in particular, had an active Dutch community with a highly divergent dialect spoken as recently as the 1950s. See Jersey Dutch for more on this dialect.
 In Pella, Iowa, a derivation of South Guelderish is the Pella Dutch dialect.
 Afrikaans is a daughter language of Dutch. It evolved mainly from 17th century Dutch dialects, but had influences from various other languages in South Africa. However, it is still largely mutually intelligible with Dutch. 
 Plautdietsch is a Low German variety with influences and elements of Dutch.
 Despite its name, Pennsylvania Dutch is not a Dutch dialect. It is actually German-based.

Further reading
 Bont, Antonius Petrus de (1958) Dialekt van Kempenland 3 Deel [in ?5 vols.] Assen: van Gorcum, 1958–60. 1962, 1985

References

 Ad Welschen 2000-2005: Course Dutch Society and Culture, International School for Humanities and Social Studies ISHSS, Universiteit van Amsterdam 
 Cornelissen, Georg (2003): Kleine niederrheinische Sprachgeschichte (1300-1900): eine regionale Sprachgeschichte für das deutsch-niederländische Grenzgebiet zwischen Arnheim und Krefeld [with an introduction in Dutch. Geldern / Venray: Stichting Historie Peel-Maas-Niersgebied, ] 
 Driessen, Geert (2012): Ontwikkelingen in het gebruik van Fries, streektalen en dialecten in de periode 1995-2011. Nijmegen: ITS.
 Elmentaler, Michael ( ? ): "Die Schreibsprachgeschichte des Niederrheins. Forschungsprojekt der Uni Duisburg", in: Sprache und Literatur am Niederrhein, (Schriftenreihe der Niederrhein-Akademie Bd. 3, 15–34).
 Frins, Jean (2005): Syntaktische Besonderheiten im Aachener Dreiländereck.  Eine Übersicht begleitet von einer Analyse aus politisch-gesellschaftlicher Sicht. Groningen: RUG Repro [Undergraduate Thesis, Groningen University] 
 Frins, Jean (2006): Karolingisch-Fränkisch. Die plattdůtsche Volkssprache im Aachener Dreiländereck. Groningen: RUG Repro [Master's Thesis, Groningen University] 
 Frings, Theodor (1916): Mittelfränkisch-niederfränkische Studien I. Das ripuarisch-niederfränkische Übergangsgebiet. II. Zur Geschichte des Niederfränkischen in: Beiträge zur Geschichte und Sprache der deutschen Literatur 41 (1916), 193–271; 42, 177–248.
 Hansche, Irmgard (2004): Atlas zur Geschichte des Niederrheins (= Schriftenreihe der Niederrhein-Akademie; 4). Bottrop/Essen: Peter Pomp. 
 Ludwig, Uwe & Schilp, Thomas (eds.) (2004): Mittelalter an Rhein und Maas. Beiträge zur Geschichte des Niederrheins. Dieter Geuenich zum 60. Geburtstag (= Studien zur Geschichte und Kultur Nordwesteuropas; 8). Münster/New York/München/Berlin: Waxmann. 
 Mihm, Arend (1992): Sprache und Geschichte am unteren Niederrhein, in: Jahrbuch des Vereins für niederdeutsche Sprachforschung; 1992, 88–122. 
 Mihm, Arend (2000): "Rheinmaasländische Sprachgeschichte von 1500 bis 1650", in: Jürgen Macha, Elmar Neuss, Robert Peters (eds.): Rheinisch-Westfälische Sprachgeschichte. Köln (= Niederdeutsche Studien 46), 139–164.
 Tervooren, Helmut (2005): Van der Masen tot op den Rijn. Ein Handbuch zur Geschichte der volkssprachlichen mittelalterlichen Literatur im Raum von Rhein und Maas. Geldern: Erich Schmidt 

 
Dutch language
Languages of the Netherlands
Languages of Belgium
Low Franconian languages